Loch Callater is an upland, freshwater loch lying approximately  south of Braemar, Scotland. The loch trends in a northwest to southeast direction and is surrounded on both sides by steep hills.

The loch was surveyed on 11 July 1905 by T.N. Johnston and L.W. Collett and later charted  as part of the Sir John Murray's Bathymetrical Survey of Fresh-Water Lochs of Scotland 1897-1909.

Trout, salmon, eels and perch are found in the loch. A permit is required for fishing.

The loch and surrounding area is popular with walkers and at the north end is the Callater Stable walkers' bothy.

References

Callater
Callater
Dee Basin